= Dice Soccer =

2011 video game

- Developer: LambdaMu Games
- Publisher: LambdaMu Games
- Platform: iOS
- Release: July 28, 2011
- Genre: Sports

Dice Soccer is an iOS game developed by Singaporean studio LambdaMu Games and released on July 28, 2011.

== Critical reception ==
The game has a Metacritic score of 84% based on 5 critic reviews.

Slide To Play wrote "Dice Soccer will have you rolling dice and cheering on cartoons at all hours, but a few glitches and a slow pace hold it back from being great." Gamezebo said "With a bunch of different unlockables (players and vanity items like jerseys) and different leagues of varying difficulties, not to mention tournaments, Dice Soccer really does offer a decent amount of content. Once you get past the goofy idea and put some time in, the game opens up and really presents a nice experience."

TouchArcade said "If you've got the patience to stick it out, though, Dice Soccer will give you more content than you can handle." AppSpy wrote "This addictive combination of soccer, strategy, and chance might grab you, but beware of the extra costs that might be involved if you get yourself hooked." Level.nu wrote "A turn based soccer game based on dice and constantly collecting new, better players. There's smart tactics under the seemingly random game mechanics. Be prepared to spend many hours getting your dream team together."
